Roslee bin Daud is a Malaysian politician and served as Terengganu State Executive Councillor.

Election results

References

Living people
Malaysian people of Malay descent
Malaysian Muslims
People from Terengganu
United Malays National Organisation politicians
Members of the Terengganu State Legislative Assembly
Terengganu state executive councillors
Year of birth missing (living people)